Corinne Gibbons, is an Australian singer-songwriter active in the global independent music scene. She kicked off her touring career with Jack Sonni from Dire Straits in 1990 and went on to record with Tower of Power in Los Angeles in 1994.

Corinne has released 4 albums. The 2002 release of Dusk’, peaked at #2 on Australia’s Independent Jazz Charts. Her 3rd album, MELT, was released in 2009 Won awards at The World Wildlife Film Festivals, The Hamptons, and North Virginia festivals inclusively.

In 2006 Corinne moved to Singapore where she has had a prolific time as a songwriter. Focused on music for children, she has composed music for three children's musicals, two for Singapore Repertory Theatre, "Bear and Chicken" and "Jungle Book." She also composed a song for Hi5 Five Food Groups.

 She founded Voices of the Future in 2008, which provides singing and songwriting workshops for children from 7 years of age.

She founded Discover Your Voice which facilitates Choral workshops for companies - creating harmony in the work place through harmony in song. This has taken Corinne all over the world. Her personal work with CSR programs and connecting companies to community saw her working with Phil Collins's charity The Little Dreams Foundation in 2011 with MCI.

Corinne has volunteered with charity organisations and has conducted workshops and fundraising events all over Southeast Asia. She has worked with The Island Foundation for 7 years providing music workshops for children which assist them in preserving their heritage in song.

Discography

Albums

References

External links 
 

Year of birth missing (living people)
Living people
Australian women singer-songwriters